The Consumer Guidance Society of India (CGSI) is a Non-Profit consumer organization established in India in 1966 to protect and educate the Indian consumer about sub-standard products and services, adulterated foods, short weights and measures, spurious and hazardous drugs, exorbitant prices, endemic shortages leading to black marketing and profiteering, unfulfilled manufacture guarantees, and a host of other problems.

History
Since independence, India has been striving to develop and strengthen its industrial base. However, in this pursuit of "self-sufficiency", exploitation of consumers by manufacturers and service providers became rampant in India. In the 1960s, only a few monopolistic business houses controlled industry. In one infamous case, forty persons suffered dropsy and glaucoma after consuming groundnut oil adulterated with toxic argemone oil. The victims did not get any justice and the culprits escaped without punishment. This outrage energized nine women to organize a movement to fight for consumer rights and to form the CGSI in 1966.

Governing body
CGSI founders

 Ms. Seeta Gupta (social worker)
 Ms. Indira Mazumdar (social worker)
 Ms. Seeta Nadkarni (social worker)
 Dr. Leela Thorat (doctor)
 Ms. Leela Jog (journalist)
 Ms. Kamala Mankekar (journalist)
 Dr. Shanta S. Rao (scientist)
 Ms. Nalini Tulpule (social worker)
 Ms. Shakuntala Kadam (social worker)

Several public minded citizens and illustrious persons have joined their cause down the years.

CGSI presidents

 1969–1972 Justice B. N. Gokhale (retd.)
 1972–1974 Shri. G. L. Mehta (ex-ambassador)
 1974–1977 Justice J. C. Shah (retd.)
 1977–1981 Justice J. L. Nain (retd.)
 1982–1983 Dr. (Smt.) Kamala Sohonie
 1984–1986 Smt. Leela Jog
 1986–1988 Justice B. J. Rele
 1988–1990 Justice Y. J. Chandrachud (chief justice Supreme Court retd.)
 1990–1991 Justice B. Lentin (retd.)
 1992–1995 Shri. J. B. D'Souza, I.A.S. (retd.)
 1995–1997 Shri. Julio Ribeiro, I.P.S. (retd.)
 1997–2001 Smt. Krishna Basrur
 2001–2004 Smt. Shalini Sirur
 2004–2006 Shri. N. G. Wagle
 2006–2014 Shri. S. P. Upasani, I.A.S. (retd.)
 2014–present Prof. N. M. Rajadhyaksha

CGSI Managing Committee: 2020–2021

 Trustees: Mr. B. V. Desai, Mr. Nooruddin Sevwala, Mr. Cornad Saldanha
 President: Prof. N. M. Rajadhyaksha
 Vice-President: Dr. Shirish Waghuldhe
 Chairman: Dr. Sitaram Dixit  --------- Dr. S S D
 Vice-Chairman: Mr. Simon P. D'Costa
 General Secretary: Dr. M. S. Kamath
 Joint Secretary (Educational Programs): Mr. Dinesh S. Bhandare
 Joint Secretary (Navi Mumbai): Mr. Santosh Shukla
 Treasurer: Mr. Goutam Bhatia
 Joint Treasurer Mr. Vikrant Jindal
 Director Legal: Mr. Rajesh Kothari (Co-opted)
 In-charge Office Administrations & Co-ordination: Mrs. Anindita Kovoor
 Electrical, Electronic Solar Panel (In-charge):Goutam Bhatia
 Editor KEEMAT: Ms. Jamna Vardhachary

Members
 Mr. Raj Talreja
 Ms. Navneet Chahal

Co-opted Members:
 Mr. Anil Karandikar
 Ms. Jamna Vardhachary
 Mr. Arvind Basutkar

Invitees
 Mr. Shirish Kamdar (Pune)
 Mr. Rajiv Kakade
 Dr. Anita Kini
 Mr. Rajeev Singhal
 Mr. Yogesh Vyas (CA - Finiancial Accounts Advisor)
 Mr. Nandakumar Menon

CGSI has on date has about 3000 lifetime members spread all over India with all Managing Committee Members and office bearers at helm being unpaid honorary volunteers.

Legal framework

CGSI was the first consumer organization to demand a special consumer court for the redressal of consumers' complaints. In 1975, CGSI led a delegation of five consumer organizations from different parts of India to the then Minister for Food and Civil Supplies, Mr. T. A. Pai, and demanded for a comprehensive consumer protection act, special consumer courts, and a directorate for implementation of the act. 

CGSI's constant follow-up was instrumental in enacting the "Consumer Protection Act 1986" by the Government of India.

Consumer activities

CGSI's important activities include: (1) consumer education (2) holding talks and exhibitions to spread consumer rights awareness among urban poor and rural areas (3) consumer complaints redressal (4) testing of consumer products (5) publication of KEEMAT a bi-monthly news magazine now published for over 20 years having articles of general consumer awareness, for CGSI members and general public.

Consumer education for schools and colleges

CGSI's Education Committee members had been working with other likeminded educationists to introduce formal Consumer Education in the school curriculum. After two years of meetings and discussions, CGSI efforts bore fruit. In 1994, the Maharashtra Education Board introduced Consumer Education at the (9th) Ninth Standard Level, progressively covering students from the (4th) Forth Standard upwards. The subject taught are the Consumer Moment, Rights & Responsibilities of Consumers, the Consumer in the Market Place, Food Adulteration, Weights and Measures, Environment protection, etc. These topics included under the existing subjects like Civics, Economics and Home science, are project-based, and more practical in nature than theoretical or examination oriented.

Consumer education

CGSI conducts programs and educates consumers in various topics, such as:

 General Consumer Awareness
 How to file a Grievance with the appropriate Authority
 Consumer Courts
 Right to Information Act
 Education Planning
 Food Adulteration & Milk Adulteration
 Oils / Vanaspati - (Dangers of Trans-fats)
 Soaps and Detergents –Types, Grades, How to purchase
 Cosmetics – Types, Grades, How to purchase
 Flavors & Fragrances / Perfumes / Body sprays – Types, Grades, How to purchase, Dangers of using cheap products
 Property
 Telecommunications
 Electricity
 Energy Conservation
 Electrical appliances
 Insurance
 Cooperative Housing Societies
 Airlines & Surface Transport
 Banking
 Specialized Finance Subjects like
 Commodities Exchange
 How to manage your finances
 How to stay out of debt
 The Debt Market
 Mutual Funds
 Stock Exchanges

Consumer education project for rural consumers

CGSI started a rural project in the villages of Thane and Raigad districts (Maharashtra) in 1997, with a staff of six and funding from Action Aid. By 1999, CGSI had given consumer training to consumers in 112 villages. Over 32,300 people have received consumer education through 750 talks and demonstrations in the 2 years of the project, 107 training programs were organized and special training in consumer activism given to 5,767 potential activists. Many local consumer groups have been set up in different areas by the consumers themselves that are now actively organizing exhibitions, holding talks and redressing complaints. In the years 2005–06 and 2006–07, CGSI conducted consumer clubs in 25 schools each in Thane & Raigad District with the help of Maharashtra State Government. CGSI trained a total of 2500 students and teachers in the subject of consumer awareness.

Holding talks and exhibitions to spread consumer rights awareness among urban poor and rural areas

CGSI's main thrust is in rural areas where consumer rights awareness is very low. With the help of its dedicated volunteers and their expertise in various fields, CGSI has been organizing consumer camps, exhibitions, imparting consumer education to school and college students, etc. Today, CGSI programs reach out to more than 20,000 consumers in a year. Now with the help of more and more experts from various fields, CGSI imparts knowledge about prudent investment, Telecom Services, food adulteration detection, medical negligence, mediation, legal redressal of complaints, etc.

Complaint redressal

CGSI handles consumer complaints and offers legal guidance to those wishing to file suits in the Consumer Courts. In cases where there are a larger number of complaints against a particular party, both sides are brought together to resolve the issue. The CGSI'S Complaints Committee meets twice a week. CGSI has redressed many thousands of consumer grievances over the years, with 70-80% success in favour of the consumers. complaints cover medical/surgical malpractice and negligence; insurance non-payment; sub-standard drugs and medicines; home remedies; defective household appliances; poor quality foods and drinks; misleading advertising claims; and grievances concerning investments, real estate, insurance, telephones, electricity supply, etc. CGSI handled over 400 complaints during the year through personal counseling sessions, correctly guiding complainants, sometimes even clearly saying that they do not have a case to fight for without wrongfully leading them on.

Product testing

As early as 1977, CGSI established formal product testing to evaluate quality by drawing samples directly from the market without involving the manufacturers in the testing process. Test results were a revelation for quality control regulatory authorities. It first assessed the safety and performance of domestic pressure stoves and found that two-thirds of the samples tested failed in safety parameters. CGSI sent the results to the government and Indian Standards Institution (ISI) now Bureau of Indian Standards (BIS), with a demand for mandatory certification. In 1986, with the passing of the Pressure Stoves Quality Control Order, ISI Certification for pressure stoves became mandatory. Subsequently, CGSI did tests on electrical appliances and fittings - irons, immersion heaters, culminating in the enactment of the Household Electrical Appliances (Quality Control) Order. CGSI has developed a food adulteration testing kit and a milk adulteration testing kit for use by the lay consumers. Many other products were tested and reports published in the society's monthly Journal, KEEMAT: edible oils, powdered spices, 'surma' (kohl), geysers, clinical thermometers, plastic water bottles, rubber teats, milk, mineral water, breads, soft drinks, bath soaps, fabric detergents, and toothpastes.

Publications

KEEMAT, India's first monthly consumer magazine is now in its 43rd year of publications. CGSI distributes KEEMAT to all its members. KEEMAT is also available as a free download to the public from dedicated CGSI website www.cgsiindia.org. CGSI has also produced a number of consumer guides on subjects like electrical appliances, edible oils, pesticides, food, adulteration, safety at home, safe blood, etc.

National award

In 1991, CGSI received the National Award for Consumer Protection for its 25th year for service to consumers. CGSI hopes to reach out to more and more consumers in the new millennium and to developed newer and more effective methods of serving consumers interest.

CGSI Representation in various bodies

Various government statutory bodies like the Bureau of Indian Standards, Telecom Regulatory Authority of India, Maharashtra Electricity Regulatory Authority of India, Insurance Regulatory and Development Authority of India, Consumer Advisory Committee of Various Industries, etc., give representation to CGSI due to its dedicated work force and expertise at its disposal. Lately, the Maharashtra State Government has given representation to CGSI in its prestigious Maharashtra State Consumer Protection Council.

Effective September 2011, the Maharashtra state government has entrusted CGSI to establish and manage the Maharashtra state consumer helpline.

Considering CGSI's experience in consumer rights protection, the Maharashtra State Government has awarded consumer helpline project to CGSI since September 2011 on five years contract. The main objectives are as follows:

 Develop a resource centre at State level which will be networked with the National Resource Centre
 Develop Alternate Consumer Disputes Redressal mechanisms at the State level
 Resolve maximum number of disputes out of court
 Promote active participation of companies and service providers in resolving consumer disputes
 Early resolution of complaints
 Reach out to rural consumers
 Capacity building of State level Voluntary Consumer Organizations
 Provide service in regional language in addition to English language

Consumers can call a dedicated toll-free number or send e-mail to seek information, advice, or guidance for their day-to-day consumer problems.

Under this project, counselors have guided nearly 20,000 aggrieved consumers in 2013–14. Maharashtra is among the top two states in terms of number of complains handled amongst nine states conducting consumer helpline project.

CGSI's documentary film Grahakpal on consumer rights

CGSI has produced a documentary film Grahakpal on consumer rights by roping a few celebrities to spread the message of consumer rights awareness. The film is screened at various seminars conducted by CGSI resulting in the helpline message reaching to nearly 16,000 viewers in a year, majority of the viewers are college and school students who need to be responsible and aware consumers when they enter mainstream after completing their studies.

Mediation & Counselling Clinic

Mr. Girish Bapat, Cabinet Minister for Consumer Protection, Government of Maharashtra and Mr. Arun Deshpande, Chairman, Consumer Welfare Advisory Committee, Maharashtra on October 20, 2015 inaugurated the 'Mediation and Conciliation Clinic' that primarily aims to resolve cases pertaining to consumer disputes.

Landmark achievements

 I. CGSI is the earliest consumer organization in India, founded in 1966.
 II. CGSI was the first organization to demand a 'Consumer Protection Act' with 'Consumer Courts' to implement it. This became a reality in 1986.
 III. To date, CGSI has redressed more than 80% of the thousands of complaints referred to it by consumers.
 IV. CGSI was the first to establish formal 'Consumer Product Testing' in India.
 V. CGSI was the first to publish a monthly magazine KEEMAT carrying information of importance to consumers.
 VI. CGSI was the first to promote consumer education; initiate training projects in rural areas; promote publicity drives; and represents consumer interests with Government and other regulatory bodies.
 VII. CGSI received the National Award for Consumer Protection in 1991.
 VIII. CGSI participates in a large number of technical committees and Government decision-making bodies.
 IX. CGSI is a member of the Maharashtra State Consumer Protection Council.
 X. CGSI has produced a documentary film "Grahakpal" on consumer rights for easy dissemination to consumers.
 XI. CGSI is among the top two states in terms of number of complains handled amongst nine states conducting consumer helpline project.

With the number of queries and requests increasing steadily, and the eagerness to cover more and more consumers, CGSI is also conducting educational seminars in other states like Bihar, Jharkhand and Delhi apart from Maharashtra. During the last few years, CGSI is conducting nearly 250 seminars each on Telecom, Banking, Financial Awareness, Food Safety etc. CGSI has ambitious targets to reach more and more consumers through its consumer education programs and make India, a country of aware consumers resulting in flourishing markets with quality products and services.

References
Consumer Guidance Society of India

External links
Consumer Acts India
Consumer court forum
Consumer Guidance Society of India

Consumer organisations in India